Dighikala west is a village in Hajipur, vaishali district, Bihar state of India.

Geography
This panchayat is located at

panchayat office
samudayik bhawan Chak Bigha Jani (समुदाियक भवन Chak Bigha Jani )

Nearest City/Town
Hajipur (Distance 3 km)

Nearest major road highway or river
NH 77 (National highway 77)
SH 49 ( state highway 49)
And 
Railway line

compass

Villages in panchayat
The following villages are in this panchayat

References

Gram panchayats in Bihar
Villages in Vaishali district
Vaishali district
Hajipur